Johann Georg Reinhardt ( – 6 January 1742) was an Austrian composer. (His name is sometimes spelt Rheinhardt, Reinhard, or Reinharth.)

Appointed imperial court organist on 1 January 1708, he later became later Kapellmeister of St. Stephen's Cathedral, Vienna. One of his students was Giuseppe Bonno. He composed ballets, serenatas, one opera and some church music.

Stage works
La più bella (libretto: Pietro Pariati), componimento da cantarsi per musica (1715, Vienna)
L'eroe immortale (libretto: Pietro Pariati), servizio da camera (1717, Vienna)
Il giudizio di Enone (libretto: Pietro Pariati), festa teatrale per musica (1721, Vienna)

External links
Bach Cantatas website biography, accessed 19 October 2010
Operone page, accessed 19 October 2010

1670s births
1742 deaths
Musicians from Vienna
Austrian classical composers
Austrian Baroque composers
Year of birth uncertain
18th-century classical composers
18th-century Austrian male musicians
Austrian male classical composers